Ajit Gulabchand (born 1948) is an Indian industrialist. Gulabchand is the chairman and managing director of Hindustan Construction Company. Gulabchand serves as chairman of the board of governance at National Institute of Construction Management & Research (NICMAR) and as chairman of Walchand College of Engineering, Sangli.

Early life
Gulabchand was born to a Jain family settled in Solapur, where he possesses ancestral property.  He is the son of Gulabchand Hirachand.

Career
Gulabchand has been a director of Indian a Hume Pipe since 1993. He serves as director of Hindustan Finvest, HCC Infotech,  Hincon Technoconsult, Hincon Realty, Hincon Holdings, Ucchar Investments, Western Securities, LAVASA Corporation, Motorsports Association of India, Constructmall.com, Champali Garden, Shalaka Investment, Gulabchand Foundation and as an independent, non-executive director of Bajaj Electricals.

He is a founding member of the World Economic Forum's Disaster Resource Network and a member of the National Council of Confederation of Indian Industry (CII). He is a promoter of the Lavasa township, intended to be India's first new hill station since independence.

Education 
Gulabchand graduated from Sydenham College, Mumbai University, with a bachelor's degree in commerce.

References

External links
Hindustan Construction Company. Executive Biography: Ajit Gulabchand

Businesspeople from Mumbai
Living people
Businesspeople in construction
21st-century Indian Jains
Gujarati people
Walchand family
Construction industry of India
1948 births